SMP may refer to:

Organisations
 Scale Model Products, 1950s, acquired by Aluminum Model Toys
 School Mathematics Project, UK developer of mathematics textbooks
 Sekolah Menengah Pertama, "junior high school" in Indonesia
 Shanghai Municipal Police, until 1943
 Sipah-e-Muhammad Pakistan, Pakistani group banned as terrorist
 Post-nominal letters of Roman Catholic order Sisters of Mary of the Presentation
 Standard Motor Products (NYSE: SMP), US automotive product company
 , the Finnish Rural Party, 1959-2003

Science and technology
 Shape-memory polymer, smart materials
 Signal Message Processor, for the Multifunctional Information Distribution System
 Silyl modified polymers, used in adhesives and sealants
 Simulation Model Portability, SMP2, European space mission simulator standard
 Slow-moving proteinase, the enzyme Cathepsin E
 Socialist millionaire problem in cryptography
 Sorbitan monopalmitate, a food additive
 SOTA Mapping Project, a website for radio amateurs
 Stable marriage problem in mathematics
 Stable massive particle in physics, e.g the MoEDAL experiment
 Surface-mount package, for electronic components

Computing
 Serial Management Protocol for Serial attached SCSI (SAS)
 System Modification Program, IBM mainframe software
 SMP/E (System Modification Program/Extended), IBM mainframe software
 Supplementary Multilingual Plane, Unicode characters for historical scripts
 SMP (computer algebra system)
 Symmetric multiprocessing
 Security Manager Protocol used in Bluetooth Low Energy
 SimpleX Messaging Protocol, a privacy focused messaging protocol

Entertainment
 SMP (band)
 Survival Multiplayer, a common Minecraft server gamemode
 Dream SMP, a Minecraft server colloquially referred to as "the SMP"

Other uses
 Securities Markets Program of the European Central Bank
 Statutory Maternity Pay in the UK
 Sau Mau Ping station, Hong Kong
 Scalp micropigmentation
 SHOKUGAN MODELING PROJECT, a Japanese plastic model kit series released by Bandai
 Single-member plurality voting
 Sydney Motorsport Park, a motorsport facility located in Australia
 SMP Racing, a Russian auto racing team